Grandview High School is a public high school serving 804 students in grades 9-12 located in Grandview, Washington, United States. The athletic team name is the Greyhounds. The current principal is Derek Anderson.

References

Public high schools in Washington (state)
High schools in Yakima County, Washington